The Tall, Tall Gentleman is a studio album by country music singer Carl Smith. It was released in 1963 by Columbia Records (catalog no. CL-2091).

The album debuted on Billboard magazine's country album chart on January 11, 1964, peaked at No. 12, and remained on the chart for a total of 11 weeks.

AllMusic gave the album a rating of two-and-a-half stars.

Track listing
Side A
 "Back Up Buddy"
 "This Orchid Means Goodbye"
 "Loose Talk"
 "No More Loose Talkin'"
 "The Tall, Tall Gentleman"
 "Wait a Little Longer, Please Jesus"

Side B
 "(When You Feel Like You're In Love) Don't Just Stand There"
 "Try to Take It Like a Man"
 "Before I Met You"
 "Live for Tomorrow"
 "Air Mail to Heaven"
 "I Dreamed of the Old Rugged Cross"

References

1963 albums
Carl Smith (musician) albums
Columbia Records albums